Vylkovo is a rural locality (a selo) and the administrative center of Vylkovsky Selsoviet, Tyumentsevsky District, Altai Krai, Russia. The population was 1,925 as of 2013. It was founded in 1726. There are 24 streets.

Geography 
Vylkovo is located 29 km south of Tyumentsevo (the district's administrative centre) by road. Grishenskoye is the nearest rural locality.

References 

Rural localities in Tyumentsevsky District